Ray Cresp (25 August 1928 - 20 August 2022) was an international speedway rider from Australia.

Speedway career 
Cresp was a professional boxer as a teenager before taking up road racing and moto cross. He was mentored by Jack Biggs before he moved to the UK in 1956. He rode in the top tier of British Speedway from 1956 to 1966, riding for various clubs. He gained four Australian caps and six British caps (when riders from Oceania were allowed to represent Britain.

Cresp reached the final of the Speedway World Championship in the 1961 Individual Speedway World Championship.

He was a builder by trade and when he returned to Australia he enjoyed fly-fishing. He died in 2022.

World final appearances

Individual World Championship
 1961 –  Malmö, Malmö Stadion - 14th - 3pts

References 

1928 births
2022 deaths
Australian speedway riders
Eastbourne Eagles riders
Ipswich Witches riders
Long Eaton Archers riders
Norwich Stars riders
Oxford Cheetahs riders
Poole Pirates riders
St Austell Gulls riders
Wembley Lions riders
West Ham Hammers riders